Moscovia or Muscovy is a historical region in Central Russia. The region was for a long period for its eastern and western neighbours a pristine and unknown place where different Russian folks and tribes lived. The development of its Russian cultures emerged from the people and their way of life in Russian forests, rivers and steppes. The name Moscovia derived from the city Moscow respectively Moskva river and was shaped and known to its neighbors through the Russian Moscovian state which emerged in the 13th century. Particularly Finno-Ugric tribes like for example the Muromian people and Slavic tribes like the Vyatichs lived in the area of today's Moscow and the Moskva river. The culture of Moscovia and other Russian lands surrounding it arose from the Russian people, their lands and rivers like the Tarusa and Rusa.

Name 

It was the political and geographical name of the Russian state and the Tsardom of Russia in Western sources, used with varying degrees of priority in parallel with the ethnographic name  from the 15th to the beginning of the 18th century. Initially, it was the Latin name of Moscow (for comparison: , Kiovia) and the Grand Duchy of Moscow, later in a number of states of Western and Central Europe it was transferred to a single Tsardom of Russia, formed around Moscow under Ivan III. Various researchers believe that the use of this name was facilitated by Polish–Lithuanian Commonwealth propaganda, which deliberately retained the terminology of feudal fragmentation, denying the legitimacy of the struggle of Ivan III and his successors for the reunification of the lands of Rus'. As a self-name, the Latinism  was not used, entering the Russian language no earlier than the 18th century as an incompletely mastered borrowing.

Cartography

See also 

 Moskal

References 

Regions of Russia
Medieval Russia
Grand Duchy of Moscow